Champai Soren is an Indian politician and is member of the Jharkhand Legislative Assembly. He is a member of the Jharkhand Mukti Morcha and represents Seraikella (Assembly constituency) of Jharkhand. He is currently serving as the Cabinet Minister of Transport, Scheduled Tribes and Scheduled Caste & Backward class welfare in the cabinet of Chief Minister of Jharkhand Hemant Soren.

Position held

References

https://mobile.twitter.com/champaisoren

State cabinet ministers of Jharkhand
Members of the Jharkhand Legislative Assembly
Jharkhand Mukti Morcha politicians
Living people
Year of birth missing (living people)